Blanca Liliana Moreno Canchon (born 8 July 1992) is a Colombian professional racing cyclist, who most recently rode for UCI Women's Continental Team .

Major results

2010
5th Overall Vuelta a Cundinamarca

2011
3rd Overall Vuelta Femenino del Porvenir
8th Time Trial, National Road Championships

2012
1st  Overall Vuelta Femenino del Porvenir
1st Stage 2
1st  Overall Clasica Ciudad de Soacha
1st Stage 3
7th Time Trial, National Road Championships

2013
1st  Overall Vuelta Femenino del Porvenir
1st Prologue, Stages 2 & 3 (ITT)
2nd Overall Clasica Ciudad de Soacha
3rd Overall Clasica Ciudad de Bogota
1st Stage 2 (ITT)

2016
1st  Overall Vuelta a Cundinamarca
1st Stage 2 (ITT)
2nd Overall Clasica Ciudad de Soacha
National Road Championships
2nd Road Race
9th Time Trial
3rd Overall Vuelta a Boyaca
3rd Overall Clasica IDRD Esteban Chaves (Bogota)
1st Stage 1
3rd Overall Vuelta Al Tolima
3rd Overall Clasica Alcaldia de Anapoima
1st Stage 2
4th Overall Vuelta a Colombia
4th Overall Vuelta Internacional Femenina a Costa Rica
9th Overall Vuelta Femenino del Porvenir
1st Stage 3

2017
1st  Overall Clasica Ciudad de Soacha
1st Stage 3
1st  Overall Clasica IDRD Esteban Chaves
1st Stage 1 (ITT) & 4
1st  Overall Clasica 20 de Julio
1st Stage 1 (ITT)
1st  Overall Vuelta a Boyaca
1st Stage 2 (ITT)
1st  Overall Vuelta a Cundinamarca
1st Stage 2 (ITT)
2nd Overall Vuelta Internacional Femenina a Costa Rica
1st Stage 2 (ITT)
3rd Overall Vuelta a Colombia
3rd Overall Clasica Alcaldia de Anapoima
5th Time Trial, National Road Championships
7th Overall Vuelta Femenino del Porvenir

2018
1st  Overall Vuelta Internacional Femenina a Costa Rica
1st Stage 2 (ITT)
1st  Overall Clasica Nacional Ciudad de Anapoima
1st Stages 1 (ITT) & 2

2019
 1st  Road race, National Road Championships
1st  Overall Vuelta Femenina a Guatemala

References

External links

1992 births
Living people
Colombian female cyclists
20th-century Colombian women
21st-century Colombian women